Gråbrødretorv 11 is a property situated on the south side of Gråbrødretorv in the Old Town of Copenhagen, Denmark. Originally a brewer's house from 1731, it was adapted and heightened by one storey in the first half of the 1840s. It was around the same time expanded with a four-storey residential building at Valkendorfsgade 20 on the other side of the block. The entire complex was listed in the Danish registry of protected buildings and places in 1932.

History

Early history

The site where Gråbrødretorv 11 stands today was in 1689 as No. 133 in Frimand's Quarter owned by Master Anders Guntzow, The site in Valkendorfsgade, with four tennencies, was owned by Master Andre's hairs. Both properties were together with most of the other buildings in the area destroyed in the Copenhagen Fire of 1728 and subsequently merged into a single property. The current building on Gråbrødretorv was constructed for brewer Bent Bentsen in 1731. In 1756, it was as No. 123 owned by  Johan Jørgen Holst. The property was later sold to  Peler Christian Kinckel (1730-1800).

Hans and Johanne Marie Swane, 1789-1808
 
In 1789, Kinckel sold the property to Hans Svane for 21,000 rifsdaler.  Hans Swane (1753-1803) was the son of sea captain Lars Swane and Johanne Marie Harboe. His parents had owned the property at Gammel Strand 42 (then No. 12) from 1764. His late father had between 1757 and 1771 captained six expeditions to Canton and Tranquebar for the Danish Asiatic Company. Hans Swane had himself spent five years in Canton from 1773 to 1778. He later visited China three more times with ships of the Danish Asiatic Company, last time as acting supercargo in 1788. On 10 March 1788, he had married Johanne Marie Gad, prompting his wist to substitute his turbulent life at sea with a more secure life as a brewer in Copenhagen.

The property was then a three-storey building with two gables facing the square. Swane resided with his family in the ground floor apartment. The more stately apartments on the two upper floors were let out. The brewery was situated in a perpendicular side wing. It featured a wall dormer with a pulley. The capacity of the copper boiler in the ground floor was 14 barrels of malt. The basement was used for the yeasting and cooling processes. The upper floors were used for the storage of malt and grain. The rear wing contained a passageway in the ground floor and residential quarters for servants and staff on the upper floors. The three storey building on Kokkegade (now Valkendorffsgade) contained a gateway and stabling for four horses in the ground floor. The upper floors were used as storage space for animal feed, firewood and grain. The building featured a wall dormer with a pulley towards the yard.

In October 1794, Swane was also licensed as a timber merchant. He leased one of the 16 lumberyards near Kalvebod Beach.

 
Hans and Johanne Marie Swane were at the time of the 1801 census residing in the building with their children  Lars Swane; Johanne Marie Elisabeth Swane; Jørgen Swane; Birgithe Francisca Swane and Hans Marius Swane. Swane's sister Birgitte was married to pastor Søren Sørensen Ingemann at Thorkildstrup Rectory on Lolland. Their son Lars Ingemann (1778-) was at the time of the 1801 census also living with his uncle in the home on Gråbrødretorv while he was studying in Copenhagen. A younger son was the later priest and writer Bernhard Severin Ingemann. He was in the early part of his life a close friend of Lars Svane and often visited the family on Gråbrødretorv. A brewer, a brewery boy, a caretaker, two maids and three lodgers were also living there with them. The three lodgers were senior clerk in Rentekammeret Jørgen Schmidt, student Peder Steer	 and Fähnrich in  the Norwegian Life Regiment Frederik von Munck. The property was at this point also home to one other household, consisting of ship's masterAndreas Falck, his wife Margrethe née Bastian and their daughter Maren Falck.

Hans Swane died unexpectedly in 1803. Johanne Marie Swane retain undivided possession of the estate. The property was in the new cadastre of 1806 listed as No. 106. In August 1806, Johanne Marie Swane rented out the brewery. In 1806, she sold it for 16,000 kurantdaler with 8,000 rigsdaler paid up front. In 1810, she purchased the property at Larsbjørnstræde No. 169 (now Larsbjørnstræde 5) for 30,200 rigsdaler. In 1811, she sold it again for 45,000 rigsdaler.

19th century
 
The property was at the time of the 1840 census home to a total of 28 people. The distiller Wilhelm Bendtsen resided on the ground floor with his wife Johanne Lundsteen, six employees and the 54-year-old businessman Andreas Collstrup.	 The first floor was occupied by the restaurateur Moses Levin. his wife Hanne née Amuel, their two children, two maids, the cigar-maker Abraham Jacobi, weaver Berreg Binel and basket maker  Max Koldseh. Jacob Levy, a master tailor, resided with his wife Clarine Gabriel, their five children and three employees on the second floor. 
The building on Gråbrødretorv was adapted and heightened with one storey in 184344. The building was at the time of the 1845 census home to a total of 40 people. David Monrad, who had served as Post Master General from 1835 to 1842, resided with his wife, their divorced daughter and grandson, the lady's companionIda Dorthea Luise Petrea Uldahl	and a maid in the apartment on the first floor. Sørine Thaarup, a 45-year-old woman, was operating a bording home on the third floor. Her 13 lodgers were mostly university students from the provinces. Marinus Severin Aabel, a grocer, resided with his wife, two sons and a maid in the basement.

The current building at Valkendorfsgade 20 (then Kokkegade No. 106) was constructed for junk dealer Christen Olsen Høedt in 1844. The building was at the time of the 1845 census home to 27 people. Christian Olsen Høedt, the owner of the building, resided with his wife Marie Høedt, their two children and two maids on the first floor. Their son  (1820-1883) would later become a prominent actor and stage director. Johan Peter Holmer (1798-1871). a high-ranking civil servant at City Hall who would later serve as mayor of the city's 2nd Department from 1858 to 186, resided with his wife, two children and a maid on the second floor. The son Valdemar Holmer (1833-1884) would later become a prominent surgeon at Frederiks Hospital. , a postmaster, resided with his wife, six children and two maids on the third floor. Jacobine Landholm, a restaurateur, resided with her two children and a maid on the ground floor.

The cook book writer Anne Marie Mangor (née Bang; 1781–1865) was among the residents in 1856. The later artists Frants Henningsen (1850-1908) and Erik Henningsen (1855-1930) resided in the building with their parents from 1865. The publishing house Th. Lind was based at Gråbrødretorv 11 in the years around 1880.

20th century
The property was at the time of the 1906 census home to a total of 28 people. Hans Christian Jørgensen, a courier, resided on the first floor with his wife Anna Dorthea Johanne Jørgensen and their and their 19-year-old daughter Anna Dorthea Johanne Jørgensen. Vilhelm August Salomonsen, a founding partner of M & V Salomonsen, resided on the second floor with the Rosalie Julie Salomonsen, their 22-year-old daughter Julie Salomonsen	 and one maid. Lars Peter Larsen, proprietor of the tobacco shop N. P. Larsen on Amagertorv, resided on the third floor with his wife Johanne Larsen resided, their 12-year-old son 	Wilhelm Øckenholt Larsen, two maids and one lodger. The lodger was assistant librarian at the Royal Danish Library 	Alfred Christian Larsen. Elthon Chr. Wenning, a mailman, resided on the fourth floor with his Caroline Frederikke Wenning	and their six children (aged two to 22). Axel Vilhelm Otto Smidt, a 29-year-old engineer, was also residing on the fourth floor. Poul Gabriel Smidt, a trainee in a law firm, was also residing on the fourth floor. Andreas Madsen, the proprietor of a creamery, resided in the basement with his Oline Sofhie Madsen	and their two daughters (aged 11 and 18).

Architecture

Gråbrødretorv 11
Gråbrødretorv 11 is a three-winged complex constructed with four storeys over a walk-out basement. The facade is rendered in an iron vitriol yellow colour, contrasted by the green-painted windows, doors and gate. The facade is finished with a wide belt course above the ground floor and a dentillated cornice. The front is five bays wide of which the two outer bays are wider than the three central ones. The main entrance to the restaurant in the ground floor is located in the central bay. It is raised three steps from street level and topped by a transom window. The gate in the bay furthest to the left (east) is topped by a fanlight. Part of the perpendicular west wing is visible from Gråbrødretorv due to the shape of the square. The pitched roof is clad with red tile and features a total of seven dormer window. towards the square. It is pierced by a total of five chimneys.

Valkendorffsgade 20
Valkendorddsfade 20 is constructed with four storeys over a walk-outbasement and is four bays wide. A short perpendicular wing on its rear attaches it to the rear wing of Gråbrødretorv 11. The ground floor is plastered and painted in a pale grey colour. The upper part of the facade has undressed brick with extruded joints (in Denmark known as "Hamburg joints"). The inset main entrance is raised three steps from the street level and is topped by a transom window. The basement entrance is located in the second bay from the left. The outer windows on the first floor are accented by sandstone framing and the ones on the second floor by projecting sills. The facade is finished with  a modillioned cornice. The roof is clad with black tile. It features two dormer windows towards the street.

Today
The property contains 17 condominiums and six rental spaces. It is owned by E/F Matr.nr. 106 Frimands Kvarter. Restaurant Peder Oxe is located in the ground floor of Gråbrødretorv 11.

Gallery

References

External links

 Official website
 Hans Swane at geni.com
 Source

Listed residential buildings in Copenhagen
Breweries in Copenhagen
Residential buildings completed in 1844
1731 establishments in Denmark